Adduci is a surname. Notable people with the surname include:

Jim Adduci (born 1959), American baseball player
Jim Adduci (born 1985), American baseball player
Nick Adduci (1929–2005), American football player